The National Presbyterian Church in Mexico is the second-largest Protestant church, and the largest Reformed denomination in Mexico. It is present throughout the country, and is particularly strong in the states of Tabasco, Chiapas, Campeche, Yucatan, Nuevo León, Aguascalientes and Mexico City.

Today, it consists of more than 6,000 churches and almost 2.8 million members. The National Presbyterian Church is growing rapidly.

History and formation of the church

Early years 
The beginning of Presbyterianism in Mexico dates back to 1827 with the arrival of Diego Thompson, an agent of the British and Foreign Bible Society. Pioneers of Presbyterianism in Mexico include: Dr. Julio Mallet Prevost, WG Allen, Melinda Rankin, Rev. AJ Park and Arcadio Morales.

The Beginnings 
The National Presbyterian Church in Mexico was established by missionaries from the United States. Around 1872, the Southern and Northern Presbyterian Churches, the Associate Reformed Presbyterian Church and the Congregationalist Church in the United States began working in Mexico. The Northern Presbyterian Church covered Mexico City, San Luis Potosí, Villa de Cos and in the Federal District. Later, their efforts were extended into Guerrero, Oaxaca, Veracruz and Tabasco. The Southern Presbyterian Church was active in Texas and Matamoros, Tamaulipas. The first Presbyterian missionaries were Rev. Thompson and Rev. Paul H. Petkin Rev Maxwell Philips P. Mallen Ailen of the Presbyterian Church USA arrived in Veracruz.  This work progressed rapidly. Rev Hutchinson stayed in Mexico City while the others moved north to Zacatecas and San Louis Potosi. The Mission in Mexico started with people who broke from the Episcopal church. Mr Arcadio Morales formed the first Presbyterian congregation in Mexico. Morales planted the Divine Savior Church, he became the first pastor of the church, in 1882 the church's membership grew to 552, it became the first congregation that can sustain its pastor. Earlier in 1878 the first 11 Mexican ministers were ordained.

The First Presbytery 
On May 12, 1885 the first Presbytery, the Presbytery of Mexico City was organised. Later in 1896 a new Presbytery was organised the Presbytery of the Gulf of Mexico. In the 1890s these Presbyterian missionaries united their efforts.

Formal establishment 
In 1901, the National Presbyterian Church in Mexico held its first synod with 73 churches and 5,500 members. Four presbyteries were represented from Mexico City, Zacatecas, Tamaulipas, and the Gulf of Mexico.

In 1918, American Presbyterians, the Disciples of Christ and the Methodist church met in Cincinnati, and divided mission work in the country of Mexico between them. American Presbyterians took on the southern part of Mexico and the northern region became the mission field of the Methodists. The Presbyterians get the territory from Tampico to the South and South East, reduced work only the states of Oaxaca, Chiapas, Tabasco, Campeche, Yucatan, southern Veracruz and Quintana Roo territory. Presbyterian churches in the north were told to become Methodists, while Methodists in the south were told to worship as Presbyterians. Many churches in Nuevo Leon and Monterrey resisted and stayed in the Presbyterian fold.
In Latin America–according to the Plan–the Presbyterians get Guatemala, Chile and Colombia, the Methodists get Costa Rica and Bolivia.

The National Presbyterian Church did not approve the Cincinnati Plan, considering that the national denomination has already consolidated. Rev. Leandro, who was against the Cincinnati Plan, and he and The Presbyteries of Tamaulipas, Zacatecas, was quit relations with the Southern Presbyterian Church. They feared that the Plan wants to demolish Presbyterians in the North. The Methodists protested because the Presbyterians didn't give temples to the Methodist in North Mexico, but Presbyterians get the Methodist Church buildings in Cuernavaca and Toluca and Morean in the south.

On November 28, 1919, the National Presbyterian Church in Mexico was officially formed.

New Constitution 
On July 22, 1937 a Constitution was translated by Dr. Enrique C. Thompson was approved in the General Assembly in the city of Toluca by the National Presbyterian Church in Mexico and later approved the revised edition common called the "Torres Edition".

Church developments 
In the 1920s, a Ministry among the Chiapas people began first in Spanish speaking population and in 1950 an outreach among Mayan-speaking people was made, such as Chol, Tzotil, Tzeltzal indigenous groups. Today the Chiapas region is among the strongholds of the denomination. Six presbyteries work in the southern regions of the Chiapas, Oaxaca and Potosina and Huasteca, working with local people in their languages.

In 1947 the first General Assembly was organized, with nine presbyteries, and in 1972 the denomination celebrated its 100th anniversary of life. The Mexican and US Presbyterian churches agreed to a joint effort of evangelizing.

Recent status 
In 1972 the church didn't needed any outside support. The INPM was composed of 3 synods and 18 presbyteries. The church proposed a moratorium to avoid relying on foreign missions to advance the National Church. Because the Cincinnati Plan, the church lost a lot of schools in Northern Mexico, and it broke mission efforts in Northern Mexico for decades.

In the 1990s the church had 4,800 congregations, 1.2 million members in 40 presbyteries and 7 synods.

By 1997 there were a General Assembly, 8 synods and 50 presbyteries.

In Chiapas the National Presbyterian Church grew 10-12 percent annually, with 18,000 people joining each year.

Governance 

The church is responsible for its own government, and is administered by ruling elders, teaching elders and deacons. The church's highest court is the General Assembly.

The mid-governing body is the presbytery. Currently the National Presbyterian Church in Mexico has 69 presbyteries, scattered across the country.

There are 14 synods, which are:
 The First Synod
 Yucatán Peninsula
 Federal District
 Gulf of Mexico
 Israel
 Showers of Grace
 Center
 Northeast
 Chol
 Tabasco
 Tzeltal of Chiapas
 Southeast Chiapas
 Mexiquense
The latest synod, Guerrero Synod, was formed on November 12, 2012. The synod consists of 3 presbyteries:
Pacific Presbytery with 9 churches, 11 pastors
Ebenezer Presbytery with 6 churches and 8 pastors
Maranatha Presbytery with 7 congregations and 10 pastors.

Theology 

The theology of the church is conservative and creeds and confessions represent its Reformed and Presbyterian heritage. The liturgy is a hybrid – traditional and indigenous hymns are sung, and may be accompanied by organ or piano. The guitar is frequently used, as are metrical psalms.

Confessions 
 Westminster Confession of Faith
 Westminster Shorter Catechism
 Westminster Larger Catechism
 Heidelberg Catechism
 Canons of Dort
 Second Helvetic Confession
 Belgic Confession
 The confession of faith of the Church of Scotland
The Institutes of the Christian Religion by John Calvin is widely used in the churches.

Creeds 
 Apostles' Creed
 Nicene Creed
 Athanasian Creed
 Chalcedonian Definition

Seminaries and Education 
 San Pablo Theological Seminary
 Presbyterian Theological Seminary of Mexico
 Juarez Institution
 Movipres Organisation

Interchurch activities 
The National Presbyterian Church in Mexico is a member of the World Communion of Reformed Churches and the World Reformed Fellowship. In July 1995, the National Presbyterian Church in Mexico, the Associate Reformed Presbyterian Church in Mexico and The Presbyterian church in Mexico formed the 'Alliance of Presbyterian and Reformed Churches in the Mexican Republic'.

The National Presbyterian Church has a relationship with the Presbyterian Church in America (PCA), the Christian Reformed Church in North America (CRCNA), the Evangelical Presbyterian Church (EPC), and the Reformed Church in America (RCA).
It does not have any relationship with the Roman Catholic Church because of what it perceives as the Catholic Church's role in the conquest and oppression of Mexico and its people.

The Presbyterian Church in Chile and the National Presbyterian Church made an agreement of cooperation and planting new churches in Chile.

Recent issues 
At its 2011 General Assembly, the National Presbyterian Church in Mexico voted to end its 139-year relationship with the Presbyterian Church (U.S.A.) because it disagreed with its decision to ordain gay and lesbian ministers. The mission partnership between these churches was also dissolved. In the same General Assembly, the Mexican church voted against the ordination of women ministers. The church excluded a woman minister from the National church roll in 2013 ordained by the Communion of Presbyterian and Reformed Communion in Mexico, because differences in ways the Bible is read and understandings of women's role in the church.

Missions 

The National Presbyterian Church in Mexico performs missionary work together with the Presbyterian Church in America (PCA) in a US-Mexican border ministry, in the southern parts of Mexico, as well as in the cities of Monterrey, Guadalajara, Acapulco, and Mexico City.

Some Reformed Christian missionaries cooperate and work for the National Presbyterian Church in Mexico.

Symbols

Anthem 
The National Presbyterian Church in Mexico has the hymn Sovereign Lord of the Words, authored by Félix Gómez, as its official anthem.

References

External links
National Presbyterian Church in Mexico homepage
Presbyterian Mission Agency update on Mexico
Presbyterian Outlook Foundation's Top 10 stories of 2011, featuring break between Mexican and US churches
Presbyterian Border Ministry – a joint ministry between the Presbyterian Church in the US and the National Presbyterian Church of Mexico
Report on 2012 celebrations of church's 140th anniversary

Churches in Mexico
Presbyterian denominations established in the 20th century
Presbyterian denominations in Mexico
Members of the World Communion of Reformed Churches
Members of the World Reformed Fellowship
Christian organizations established in 1901
Evangelical denominations in North America